Kang Zhensheng (born 13 October 1957) is a Chinese phytopathologist who is a professor at the College of Plant Protection, Northwest A&F University and director of State Key Laboratory of Crop Stress Biology for Arid Areas, and an academician of the Chinese Academy of Engineering.

Biography 
Kang was born in Anyue County, Sichuan, on 13 October 1957. In 1975, in the late Cultural Revolution, he became a sent-down youth in Shiquan County, Shaanxi. After resuming the college entrance examination, he studied, then taught, at what is now Northwest A&F University.

He joined the Communist Party in October 1984. He was promoted to associate professor in April 1991 and to full professor in December 1994. He was honored as a Distinguished Young Scholar by the National Science Fund for Distinguished Young Scholars in 2001. In May 2004, he became dean of the College of Plant Protection, Northwest A & F University, a post he kept until December 2006. He was appointed as a "Chang Jiang Scholar" (or " Yangtze River Scholar") by the Ministry of Education of the People's Republic of China in 2005.

Honours and awards 
 1999 State Science and Technology Progress Award (Third Class)
 2010 State Science and Technology Progress Award (Second Class)
 2012 State Science and Technology Progress Award (First Class)
 27 November 2017 Member of the Chinese Academy of Engineering (CAE)

References 

1957 births
Living people
People from Anyue County
Engineers from Sichuan
Northwest A&F University alumni
Academic staff of the Northwest A&F University
Members of the Chinese Academy of Engineering